Eugene Robert Black I (January 7, 1873 – December 19, 1934) was an American attorney and businessman who served as the 6th chairman of the Federal Reserve from 1933 to 1934. Before and after his term as chairman, Black also served as the governor of the Federal Reserve Bank of Atlanta from 1928 to 1933 and again from August 1934 until his death in December of that year.

His son, Eugene Robert Black II, had a distinguished public career on his own, serving as president of the World Bank Group from 1949 to 1963.

Early life
He was born in Atlanta, Georgia on January 7, 1873. He attended the University of Georgia, where he was a member of the Chi Phi Fraternity and the Phi Kappa Literary Society. Black practiced law for 28 years until he became president of the Atlanta Trust Company in 1921.

Career 
In 1928, he became Governor of the Federal Reserve Bank of Atlanta. He succeeded the longtime governor, Max Wellborn, who was also his daughter's father-in-law. When the Wall Street Crash of 1929 happened, he and two cashiers rushed to Nashville, Tennessee to supply currency and credit to banks in the city and surrounding region. The situation worsened with other cities in the region experiencing bank runs.

Black kept his district afloat by rushing large quantities of cash to banks that were experiencing runs and extending credit to any bank that could offer any asset of value. He kept this policy active through the Great Depression into 1933. He, along with George L. Harrison, the governor of the Federal Reserve Bank of New York, recommended open market purchases to increase reserves. His insistence on expansionist policies led to the President appointing Black to the Federal Reserve Board in 1933.

Personal life 
In 1897, he married Gussie Grady, the daughter of Henry W. Grady, the Atlanta journalist and orator. They had a son, Eugene Robert Black II. Black died of a heart attack on December 19, 1934 in Atlanta, Georgia.

References

Further reading

External links

 Statements and Speeches of Eugene R. Black

1873 births
1934 deaths
Economists from Georgia (U.S. state)
Businesspeople from Atlanta
Chairs of the Federal Reserve
University of Georgia alumni
Franklin D. Roosevelt administration personnel
Federal Reserve Bank of Atlanta presidents